United Left of Cantabria (. IUC) is the Cantabrian federation of the Spanish left wing political and social movement United Left. Jorge Crespo is the current General Coordinator. The Communist Party of Cantabria (PCC-PCE, Cantabrian federation of the PCE) and Izquierda Abierta.

In the Cantabrian elections of 2011 IUC made a coalition with Izquierda Anticapitalista with the name Social and Ecologist Left.

See also
United Left (Spain)
Communist Party of Asturias

References

External links
Official page

Cantabria
Political parties in Cantabria